"Tempest" is the second single by Sacramento, California-based alternative metal band Deftones, from their seventh studio album, Koi No Yokan. The song debuted on PureVolume's official website on October 3, 2012 along with a video featuring band members Chino Moreno and Sergio Vega giving some insight regarding the track. The song's lyrical content is representative of the supposed end of the world that would have occurred on December 21, 2012, according to various myths related to the Mayan calendar.  It was featured in the trailer for the film Jack the Giant Slayer and an episode of The Following and in the film Furious 7.

Peaking at No. 3 on the US Hot Mainstream Rock Tracks, Tempest became Deftones' most successful single on that chart, surpassing "Change (In the House of Flies)", which peaked at No. 9 in 2001.

The song has been described as post-metal. It was placed at No. 2 in Consequence of Sounds article "The Top 20 Deftones Songs", with the song described as containing "[e]xpansive textures, Shakespearian lyrics, and multiple all-time-great riffs rolled into one banger".

Track listing

Personnel
Deftones
 Chino Moreno - vocals, guitar
 Stephen Carpenter - guitar
 Abe Cunningham - drums
 Frank Delgado - keyboards, samples, turntables
 Sergio Vega - bassProduction'
 Nick Raskulinecz - producer

Charts

Weekly charts

Year-end charts

References

2012 singles
Deftones songs
2012 songs
Reprise Records singles
Song recordings produced by Nick Raskulinecz
Songs written by Stephen Carpenter
Songs written by Abe Cunningham
Songs written by Chino Moreno
Songs written by Sergio Vega (bassist)
Songs written by Frank Delgado (American musician)